Nicotinate hydroxylase may refer to:

 Nicotinate dehydrogenase (cytochrome), an enzyme
 Nicotinate dehydrogenase, an enzyme